Polytaxis is a genus of flowering plants belonging to the family Asteraceae.

Its native range is Central Asia to Afghanistan.

Species:
 Polytaxis lehmannii Bunge 
 Polytaxis pulchella Rassulova & B.A.Sharipova 
 Polytaxis winkleri Iljin

References

Cynareae
Asteraceae genera